The women's 50 metre freestyle S11 event at the 2012 Paralympic Games took place on 1 September, at the London Aquatics Centre.

Three heats were held, one with six swimmers, two with seven competitors each. The swimmers with the eight fastest times advanced to the final.

Heats

Final

References

Swimming at the 2012 Summer Paralympics
2012 in women's swimming